The Xã Đoài orange (Cam xã Đoài, Citrus sinensis 'Xã Đoài') is a cultivar of orange of Spanish origin cultivated in Vietnam at the former Catholic settlement at Xã Đoài, modern Nghi Diên village in Nghi Lộc, Nghệ An. Xã Đoài is the name of the village, and the former Grand Séminaire de Xa-Doai, in the old nôm script.

See also
 Green orange (Cam sành)

References 

 Study on induction of tetraploid citrus plants derived From local diploid cultivars

Vietnamese cuisine
Orange cultivars